The Lady Is Willing may refer to:

 The Lady Is Willing (1934 film), a 1934 British film, starring Leslie Howard and Cedric Hardwicke
 The Lady Is Willing (1942 film), a 1942 American film, starring Marlene Dietrich and Fred MacMurray